Jones Island is an island  in the Australian state of  South Australia located at the mouth of Baird Bay in the north end of Anxious Bay about  south-southeast of the town of  Streaky Bay on the west coast of Eyre Peninsula.  The island is notable as a breeding site for Australian sea lions and Australian pelicans.  The island has enjoyed protected area status since 1967 and as of 1972, it has been part of the Baird Bay Islands Conservation Park.

Description
The island is reported as having a perimeter consisting of “sharp cliffs” to its south eastern coast which is exposed to the ocean and a “ledge” on its sheltered north western side. Access to the island is reported as being weather dependent due to the absence of a suitable landing point (i.e. beach or inlet) on its sheltered side and the presence of adverse sea conditions caused by waves diffracted around its shoreline.

Formation, geology and oceanography
Jones Island was formed about 6000 years ago following the rise of sea levels at the start of the Holocene. Jones Island consists of a calcarenite layer over a granite base. It is reported as being the remnant of a “calcarenite wall that once held back the ocean from the low-lying valley to the north”.

Flora and fauna

Flora
A survey carried out during 1983 on Jones Island found that its vegetation consisted of the following five groupings: coast daisy-bush, nitre-bush,  Austral stork's bill, introduced pasture mainly on the north western side of the island and round-leaved pigface.

Fauna

Vertebrate animals are represented by mammals, birds and reptiles.  As of 1996, mammals are represented exclusively by the Australian sea lion which uses the island both as a haul out and as a breeding colony.  As of 2006, the following bird species have been observed on the island: white-faced heron, sooty oystercatcher, welcome swallow, silver gull, little grassbird, rock parrot, osprey, Australian pelican, black cormorant, black-faced cormorant, willie wagtail, crested tern, common starling, and masked plover.  While most of the bird species are reported as using the island as a roost, the Australian pelican also uses it as a breeding colony.  As of 2006, only one species of reptile, the bull skink, has been observed.

History

European discovery and use
Jones Island is one of the islands off the west coast of Eyre Peninsula where native vegetation was cleared for “grazing by early pastoralists”.
The island was named in 1908 after James W. Jones, secretary to the Commissioner of Public Works and (briefly)  Premier of South Australia, Sir Richard Butler.

Protected areas status

Jones Island first received protected area status along with the unnamed island in Baird Bay as a fauna conservation reserve declared under the Crown Lands Act 1929-1966 on 16 March 1967.  Since 1972, it has been part of the Baird Bay Islands Conservation Park.  Since 2012, the waters adjoining the shoreline of Jones Island are in a habitat protection zone within the West Coast Bays Marine Park.  The island is also located at the south eastern boundary of an area which covers the full extent of Baird Bay and which has been listed since at least 1996 as a "wetland of national importance" in the Directory of Important Wetlands in Australia.

See also
List of islands of Australia

Citations and references

Citations

References
	

Islands of South Australia
Uninhabited islands of Australia
Great Australian Bight